Maria Esteves de Medeiros Victorino de Almeida, DamSE (born 19 August 1965), known professionally as Maria de Medeiros, is a Portuguese actress, director, and singer who has been involved in both European and American film productions.

Early life
Maria de Medeiros was born in Lisbon, Portugal, the daughter of musician and composer António Victorino de Almeida. She played her first part on screen at the age of 15. At 18, she moved to France to pursue her acting studies and was a student at the CNSAD.

Medeiros speaks French fluently and has acted extensively on stage and on screen in French productions. She also acts in German, Spanish and Italian productions. Medeiros is the first Portuguese woman to be designated a UNESCO Artist for Peace.

Film career
Among Medeiros' most memorable film appearances are three early 1990s roles. Her considerable resemblance to Anaïs Nin landed her the primary role in Henry & June (1990), in which she played the author. In 1990, she played the role of Maria in Ken McMullen's film about the rise of the Paris Commune, 1871. In 1994, Medeiros appeared in Quentin Tarantino's Pulp Fiction playing Fabienne, the girlfriend of Butch Coolidge (Bruce Willis).

In 2000, Medeiros directed the film April Captains (in which she also had a small role) about the 1974 Carnation Revolution in Portugal. The film was screened in the Un Certain Regard section at the 2000 Cannes Film Festival.

In 2003, Medeiros appeared as a hairdresser in the movie My Life Without Me starring Sarah Polley. She has starred in the Canadian movie The Saddest Music in the World (2004) directed by Guy Maddin and co-starring Isabella Rossellini and Mark McKinney.

Music career

In 2007, Medeiros released the album A Little More Blue on which she performs songs by Brazilian musicians, including Chico Buarque, Caetano Veloso, Ivan Lins, and Dolores Duran. She sings in Portuguese, French ("Joana Francesa" by Buarque), and English ("A Little More Blue" by Veloso).

In 2009, she sang "These Boots Are Made for Walkin'" on The Legendary Tigerman album Femina.

Her second recording, Penínsulas & Continentes, was released on 23 February 2010.

Selected filmography

As director
Sévérine C. (1987)
Fragmento II (1988)
A Morte do Príncipe (1991)
April Captains (2000)
Mathilde au matin (2004)
Je t'aime moi non plus (2004)
Repare Bem (2012)

As actress

Silvestre (1981)
Sorceress (Le Moine et la sorcière) (1987) 
1871 (1990)
Henry & June (1990)
Meeting Venus (1991)
Huevos de Oro (1993)
Pulp Fiction (1994)
Adão e Eva (1995)
Polygraph (1996)
Go for Gold (1997)
Airbag (1997)
Spanish Fly (1998)
April Captains (2000)
Deuxième vie (2000)
Honolulu Baby (2001)
A Samba for Sherlock (2001)
Stranded: Náufragos (2002)
My Life Without Me (2003)
I, Cesar (Moi César, 10 ans 1/2, 1m39) (2003)
The Saddest Music in the World (2004)
Il resto di niente (2004)
Je m'appelle Élisabeth (2006)
Medea Miracle (2007)
Midsummer Madness (2007)
Fallen Heroes (2007)
Riparo (aka Shelter Me) (2007)
My Stars (2008)
David's Birthday (2009)
O Contador de Histórias (aka The Story of Me) (2009)
Chicken with Plums (2011)
Holidays by the Sea (2011)
Journey to Portugal (2011)
Dream and Silence (2012)
Women Directors, talking on a blade (2014)
Pasolini (2014)
The Forbidden Room (2015)
Le Fils de Joseph (2016)
The Killer (2017) 
The Broken Key (2017)
Verdades Secretas (2021)

Discography
A Little More Blue (2007)
Penínsulas & Continentes (2010)
Pássaros Eternos (2013)
The Piano's Playing the Devil's Tune (2016) — with Phoebe Killdeer & the Shift

Collaborations
Drama Box, by Mísia (2005)
Rendez-vous chez Nino Rota, CD+DVD from the Italian Mauro Gioia (2008), with Adriana Calcanhotto, Martirio, Ute Lemper, Catherine Ringer, Susana Rinaldi and Sharleen Spiteri. De Medeiros sings "La pappa col pomodoro"
Femina, by The Legendary Tigerman (2009). De Medeiros sings "These Boots Are Made for Walkin'"
Señora (ellas cantan a Serrat) (2009). De Medeiros sings "Nanas de la Cebolla"

References

External links

 
 
 
 
 
 
 
 

1965 births
Living people
20th-century Portuguese actresses
21st-century Portuguese actresses
French National Academy of Dramatic Arts alumni
French-language singers
Golden Globes (Portugal) winners
People from Lisbon
Portuguese expatriates in Spain
Portuguese film actresses
Portuguese film directors
Portuguese women film directors
Volpi Cup for Best Actress winners